Alexei Filippov (born January 5, 1989) is a Russian former professional ice hockey player.

At the Elite level, Filippov played five games in the Russian Superleague with Krylia Sovetov Moskva during the 2006-07 season.

References

1989 births
Living people
Krylya Sovetov Moscow players
People from Sergiyev Posad
Russian ice hockey forwards
Sportspeople from Moscow Oblast